Healing Angel is the first (and thus far, only) recording released by Irish actress and Touched by an Angel star Roma Downey. It was issued in 1999 on RCA Records. The album features Downey reading ancient Celtic texts, while Phil Coulter (who also produced the record), plays the music. It peaked very high on the New Age chart, reaching number 5. To date, it has sold in excess of 42,000 copies. The album contains vocals from the Irish folk singer Aoife Ní Fhearraigh.

Track listing
All songs written by Phil Coulter, except where noted.
Be Thou My Vision (trad.; arr. Coulter)(feat. Aoife Ní Fhearraigh) - 4:24
Loving - 3:12
In Perfect Harmony - 3:41
The Old Man - 3:39
Peace & Healing - 3:28
My Little Angel - 3:08
Walk On Ancient Ground - 3:16
A Simple Prayer (Coulter, Francis of Assisi) - 2:46
Longing - 3:30
Suffer Little Children - 3:28
Til Death Do Us Part - 4:22
Sunlight on the Water (instrumental) - 3:07
I Am the Wind - 3:22
Gold & Silver Days (Coulter, Sean O'Riada) - 3:04
An Irish Blessing (feat. Aoife Ní Fhearraigh) - 3:55

Chart performance (Healing Angel)

Production
Executive Producer: Steve Gates
Produced By Phil Coulter
Engineers: Tony Harris
Assistant Engineers: Aaron Gant, Frances Murphy, Dave Slevin
Mastering: Ray Staff

Personnel
Roma Downey: Spoken Word & Narration
Brian Kennedy, Reilly: Additional Vocals
Phil Coulter: Keyboards, Synthesizers, Piano, Multi-Instruments
Malachy Robinson, Liam Wylie: Bass
Lloyd Byrne: Percussion
Brendan Monaghan: Uillean Pipes
Brona Cahill, Diana Daly, Frank Gallagher (also viola & whistles), Donagh Keough, Gloria Mulhall, Kate O'Conner, Ken Rice, Louis Roden, Anita Vedres, Gillian Williams: Violin
Emily Hazelhurst, Nicholas Milne, Joachim Roewer, Rachel Walker: Viola
Donagh Collins, Alison Hood, Arun Rao: Cello
Catherine Mary Clancy: Harp
Arranged By Phil Coulter & Dave Gold

External links
[ "Healing Angel" at allmusic]

1999 debut albums
RCA Records albums
New-age albums